Count Gonghwa or Marquess Gonghwa (1126–1186), personal name Wang Yeong (왕영, 王瑛) was a Goryeo Royal family member as the great-grandson of King Munjong who became the maternal uncle of Huijong and Gangjong.

Biography

Life
Although not much information left about his life, but it was believed that he had  a calm and quiet personality, not greedy and show great enthusiasm for his studies. During the early years of King Uijong, he became a Jeonjungnaegeupsa (전중내급사, 殿中內給事) and although the King assumed this, he did not allow it since there was no precedent for a son from the Royal family who had been given the title of "Marquess" (후, 侯) and humbled himself with became a public servant (공사, 貢士) from the past.

He then became Count Gonghwa (공화백, 恭化伯) on the day he married at his 30s and the King bestowed great favors upon him. After his brother-in-law, Marquess Ikyang ascended the throne in 1170, Wang Yeong was promoted into Marquess Gonghwa (공화후, 恭化侯) and a devout believer in Buddhism on his later years before later passed away in 1186 at his 61 years old.

Relatives and Marriage
Wang Yeong had 4 sisters: Queen Janggyeong, Marchioness Daeryeong, Queen Uijeong (mother of King Gangjong), Queen Seonjeong (mother of King Huijong) and a younger brother named Wang Jak (왕작, 王鷟).

According to Goryeosa, Wang Yeong married his half second cousin once removed, Princess Seunggyeong (승경궁주; eldest daughter of King Injong) and together, they had two children: a daughter and a son. Through his only son, he would become both brother and in-law to Queen Janggyeong.
Lady Wang (왕씨, 王氏; 1150–1185), 1st daughter. She was unmarried until her death at 36 years old due to her illness in Changsin Temple (창신사, 彰信寺; Southern Gaeseong).
Wang Myeon, Duke Gwangneung (광릉공 면, 廣陵公 沔; d. 1218), 1st son. Married his first cousin (his aunt's daughter), Princess Hwasun (화순궁주, 和順宮主).

References

Wang Yeong on Encykorea .
왕영 on Doosan Encyclopedia .

1126 births
1186 deaths
12th-century Korean people